Andrea Betzner and Claudia Porwik won in the final 6–1, 6–2 against Laura Garrone and Helen Kelesi.

Seeds
Champion seeds are indicated in bold text while text in italics indicates the round in which those seeds were eliminated.

 Andrea Betzner /  Claudia Porwik (champions)
 Laura Garrone /  Helen Kelesi (final)
 Hana Fukárková /  Jana Pospíšilová (first round)
 Linda Ferrando /  Laura Golarsa (first round)

Draw

References
 1988 Taranto Open Doubles Draw

Ilva Trophy
1988 WTA Tour